Terry Jonathan "T.J." Hart (born October 27, 1946) is an American mechanical and electrical engineer, a retired United States Air Force lieutenant colonel and pilot, and former NASA astronaut. Hart served as a mission specialist on the STS-41-C mission, where tasks included operation of the shuttle Remote Manipulator System (RMS) arm to deploy the Long Duration Exposure Facility (LDEF) and Solar Max satellite.

Education
Hart was born on October 27, 1946, in Pittsburgh, Pennsylvania. He graduated from Mt. Lebanon High School in Mt. Lebanon, Pennsylvania, in 1964. He received a Bachelor of Science degree in mechanical engineering from Lehigh University in 1968, a Master of Science degree in mechanical engineering from the Massachusetts Institute of Technology in 1969, and a Master of Science degree in electrical engineering from Rutgers University in 1978.

He was awarded an honorary doctorate of engineering from Lehigh University in 1988.

Organizations
He is a member of the Institute of Electrical and Electronics Engineers, Tau Beta Pi, Sigma Xi, and Delta Upsilon.

Awards and citations
Hart received the following awards and honors:
 National Defense Service Medal
 NASA Space Flight Medal
 Outstanding Officer of Undergraduate Pilot Training Class (1970)
 Rutgers Distinguished Alumnus Award

Military service
Hart entered on active duty with the United States Air Force Reserve in June 1969. He completed Undergraduate Pilot Training at Moody Air Force Base, Georgia, in December 1970, and from then until 1973, flew F-106 interceptors for the Air Defense Command at Tyndall Air Force Base, Florida, at Loring Air Force Base, Maine, and at Dover Air Force Base, Delaware. In 1973, he joined the New Jersey Air National Guard and continued flying with the Guard until 1985, retiring as lieutenant colonel in 1990.

He has logged 3,000 hours flying time, with 2,400 hours in jets.

NASA experience
Hart was selected as an astronaut candidate by NASA in January 1978. In August 1979, he completed a one-year training and evaluation period, making him eligible for flight assignment on future Space Shuttle crews. Hart was also member of the support crews for STS-1, STS-2, STS-3, and STS-7. He was Ascent and Orbit CAPCOM with the Mission Control Team for those flights. He flew as a mission specialist on STS-41-C (April 6–13, 1984) and has logged a total of 168 hours in space.

STS-41-C Challenger

STS-41-C Challenger was launched from Kennedy Space Center, Florida, on April 6, 1984. The crew included Captain Robert Crippen (spacecraft commander), Mr. F. R. (Dick) Scobee (pilot), and fellow mission specialists, Dr. George D. Nelson and Dr. James van Hoften. During this mission, the crew successfully deployed the Long Duration Exposure Facility (LDEF); retrieved the ailing Solar Maximum Satellite, repaired it on board Challenger, and replaced it in orbit using the robot arm called the Remote Manipulator System (RMS). The mission also included flight testing of Manned Maneuvering Units (MMUs) in two extravehicular activities (EVAs); operation of the Cinema 360 and IMAX camera systems, as well as a bee hive honeycomb structures student experiment. Mission duration was 7 days before landing at Edwards Air Force Base, California, on April 13, 1984.

Civilian experience
From 1968 to 1978, Hart was employed as a member of the technical staff of Bell Labs. His principal duties included electrical and mechanical design responsibilities for a variety of electronic power equipment used in the Bell System. He has received 2 patents. He left Bell Labs in 1978 upon selection as a NASA Astronaut candidate.

After leaving NASA, he was the director of engineering and operations for AT&T's satellite network. He is currently a member of the engineering faculty at Lehigh University.

References

External links

Spacefacts biography of Terry Hart

1946 births
Living people
People from Mt. Lebanon, Pennsylvania
United States Air Force officers
Rutgers University alumni
Lehigh University alumni
MIT School of Engineering alumni
People from Northampton County, Pennsylvania
NASA civilian astronauts
Lafayette College faculty
Military personnel from Pittsburgh
Space Shuttle program astronauts